Kapka Kassabova (born in November 1973, in Bulgarian Капка Касабова) is a poet and writer of fiction and narrative non-fiction. Her mother tongue is Bulgarian, but she writes in English.

Life
Kapka Kassabova was born and grew up in Sofia, Bulgaria. She studied at the French College in Sofia. After leaving Bulgaria with her family in her late teens, she lived in New Zealand for twelve years where she studied French, Russian and English Literature and Creative Writing at the universities of Otago and Victoria, and published her first books of poetry and fiction. She moved to Scotland in 2005. After a number of years in Edinburgh, she settled in rural Inverness-shire.

Career
Her debut poetry collection All roads lead to the sea won a NZ Montana Book Award and her debut novel Reconnaissance won a Commonwealth Writers' Prize for Asia Pacific in 2000.

In 2008, Kassabova published the memoir Street Without a Name which was shortlisted for the Dolmann Club Travel Book Award and which Misha Glenny in The Guardian called a "profound meditation on the depth of change triggered by the events of 1989 throughout eastern Europe". Scotland on Sunday described it as "A memorable piece of acutely observed writing where events are relayed with a novelist’s eye. With its sharply humorous details of close family life and the evocative and sometimes almost spiritual portrayal of an era lost and a country changed forever, this book recalls the writings of Isabel Allende".

Kassabova's tango biography Twelve Minutes of Love (2011), was shortlisted for the Scottish Book Awards and hailed by The Independent as "an exquisitely crafted blend of travelogue, memoir, dance history, and some seriously good writing on the human condition." The Scotsmans reviewer wrote that "Kassabova is that rare thing, an author who excels in every genre". and the New Zealand Listener wrote that ‘Kassabova’s poetry explores exile, disconnection and loss; her novels and travel writing are rich in insight, conjuring unsettling worlds. She brings these elements together in this exhilarating account of tango’s addictive character. With a neat twist, she ultimately exposes its illusions, locating its place in a journey that is both personal and universal.’

In 2017, her book of narrative non-fiction Border: a journey to the edge of Europe was published in the UK, USA and Bulgaria, and is expected to appear in other languages. A "brave and moving study of the tragic borderland between Greece, Bulgaria and Turkey", it has been described in The Sunday Times as "an exceptional book about Bulgaria's dark, often magical borderlands...Smokily intense and quiveringly powerful." by Peter Pomerantsev as "a book about borders that makes the reader feel sumptuously free, an effect achieved by the way she moves between literary borders so gracefully: travelogue and existential drama; political history and poetry'. Mark Mazower described it in The Guardian as "a marvellous book about a magical part of the world", "mystery... is at the heart of the book; the mystery of marginal points and marginal people"  The Economist described it as "witty, poignant, and erudite", "brings hidden history vividly to light". Caroline Moorhead in The New Statesman greeted it as "a timely, powerful story of immigration, friendship and travel", "an exceptional book, a tale of travelling and listening closely, and it brings something altogether new to the mounting literature on the story of modern migration".
Professor Ash Amin of the British Academy in an award speech described Border as being "about the Eastern reaches of Europe, certainly, but also about the essence of place and the essence of human encounter." The Calvert Journal wrote that Border "reinvents writing about the Balkans."

Border won the 2018 British Academy Nayef Al-Rodhan Prize for Global Cultural Understanding, the 2018 Stanford Dolman Travel Book of the Year and the 2017 Saltire Society Scottish Book of the Year, and won the inaugural Highland Book Prize in 2018. It was shortlisted in the UK for the Baillie Gifford Prize, the Royal Society of Literature Ondaatje Prize, the Duff Cooper Prize, the Gordon Burns Prize, the Bread and Roses Award, and the National Book Critics Circle Awards in the USA.

Her 2023 book Elixir is devoted to descriptions of her revisiting a remote mountain valley in Bulgaria, which she describes, according to a review in The Economist "in subtle prose that mingles empathy with perspective".

Books

Novels and narrative non-fiction
 Reconnaissance, Penguin NZ 1999
 Love in the Land of Midas, London: Penguin, 2001, 
 Marti Friedlander by Leonard Bell, Introduction, Auckland University Press, 2009,  (at AUP)
 Street Without a Name, Portobello 2008 
 Villa Pacifica, Penguin NZ/ Alma Books 2011, 
 Twelve Minutes of Love: A Tango Story, Portobello 2011, 
 Border: A Journey to the Edge of Europe, Granta 2017/ Greywolf 2017, 
To the Lake: A Balkan Journey of War and Peace, Granta 2020, 
Elixir: In the Valley at the End of Time, Jonathan Cape 2023 / Greywolf 2023,

Poetry
 All Roads Lead to the Sea, Auckland University Press 1997 , 
 Dismemberment, Auckland University Press 1999 
 Someone Else's Life, Bloodaxe 2003
 Geography for the Lost, Bloodaxe 2007

References

External links

Author's official website
British Academy Al-Rodhan Prize
Listen to Kapka Kassabova reading her poetry for the British Library
British Council author page

1973 births
Living people
Writers from Sofia
Bulgarian emigrants to the United Kingdom
Bulgarian women poets
Bulgarian emigrants to New Zealand
20th-century Bulgarian writers
Travel writers
21st-century Bulgarian writers
20th-century Bulgarian women writers
21st-century Bulgarian women writers
English-language writers from Bulgaria